Graffiti USA is an American agency founded in 2011 in association with Klughaus Gallery, that offers commissioned aerosol spray paint murals and artwork from a group of top professional graffiti artists. Their work includes residential and commercial interiors, business exteriors, graffiti-related set design, traditional graffiti, live artwork at events and sign painting.

Work

Their work is popular with young tech companies and can be seen in the offices of Facebook and LinkedIn. Other corporate office work includes MasterCard and ABC News, which featured a Graffiti USA commissioned mural on October 8th, 2014 episode of Nightline.

References

External links

 

Graffiti in the United States
Arts organizations based in New York City
Arts organizations established in 2011
2011 establishments in the United States